The Armed Forces Act 2011 is an Act of the Parliament of the United Kingdom.

It part of a series of Acts to provide a legislative framework for the UK Armed Forces.  Apart from giving the armed forces the legal authority to exist for another five years, its major elements are establishing a requirement for the Secretary of State for Defence to make an annual report to Parliament on the implementation of the Armed Forces Covenant, some revisions to the Armed Forces Act 2006, and provisions covering the three service police forces and the Ministry of Defence Police.

Ping-pong

Royal Assent 

The Bill was given Royal Assent (and thus became an Act) on 3 November 2011.

Further reading

House of Commons Hansard, http://www.parliament.uk/business/publications/hansard/commons/
Murrison, Andrew (2011) 'Tommy This 'an Tommy That: The Military Covenant' Biteback. 
Taylor, Claire; House of Commons Research Paper 10/85 'Armed Forces Bill', Bill 122 of 2010–11. Dated 17 December 2010.

References

United Kingdom Acts of Parliament 2011
2011 in military history
United Kingdom military law
British Armed Forces
Politics of the United Kingdom